Mullin Independent School District is a public school district based in Mullin, Texas (USA).  It is mainly located in Mills County with small portions extending into Brown and Comanche counties.

It has two campuses including Mullin High School (grades 7–12) and Mullin Elementary School (grades PK–6).

Academic achievement
In 2009, the school district was rated "recognized" by the Texas Education Agency.

Special programs

Athletics
Mullin High School plays six-man football.

See also

List of school districts in Texas 
List of high schools in Texas

References

External links
Mullin ISD

School districts in Mills County, Texas
School districts in Brown County, Texas
School districts in Comanche County, Texas